Anthony Joseph Bizzaca (16 May 1921 – 12 August 2006) was an Australian rules footballer who played with Melbourne in the Victorian Football League (VFL).

Notes

External links 

1921 births
2006 deaths
Australian rules footballers from Western Australia
Melbourne Football Club players
Claremont Football Club players
People from Boulder, Western Australia